Halewood Artisanal Spirits is a global distiller and distributor of artisanal spirits.

Structure

Halewood Artisanal Spirit's head office is in London and the company distills across the UK, at the following locations: London, Edinburgh, Snowdonia, Bristol, Liverpool, Blackpool, Berkshire, Lancashire, and the Lake District. Halewood also operates distilleries in Russia and South Africa

The Halewood Group has six operations outside the UK in Australia, China, Russia, South Africa, Thailand and the United States.

History

In 1978, John Halewood created the company, selling Bulgarian wines from his garage, and launching his first product, Club Royal (sherry). In 1987, he purchased Hall & Bramley and Lamb and Watt, amalgamating their products into his existing portfolio. In 1990, he formed a joint venture in Romania just after the fall of the Berlin Wall and acquired Red Square Vodka in 1991, which he reconfigured into the new Ready to Drink market with Red Square Ice. In 1994, after witnessing the success of Lambrusco Italian wine he launched Lambrini sparkling perry which quickly became the company's largest selling product.

Halewood purchased the ginger wine brand Crabbie's from Glenmorangie in 2002 and then created the alcoholic ginger beer in 2009. Subsequently, the company has built a whisky distillery in Edinburgh.

In 2009, Halewood purchased Whitley Neill Gin from Johnny Neill; Neill was appointed as a Brand Ambassador.

John Halewood passed away in October 2011.

In April 2021, the company name changed from Halewood International to Halewood Artisanal Spirits (UK).

Halewood Artisanal Spirits is one of the UK's largest independent artisanal spirits distillers, with a turnover of more than £400 million, selling approximately 10 million cases each year and exporting to 75 countries.

Major brands

Some of Halewood's major brands include Whitley Neill Gin, JJ Whitley Vodka & Gin, Dead Man's Fingers Rum, Crabbie Whisky Aber Falls Whiskey, and the Pogues Irish Whiskey.

References

External links

 Halewood International
 Whitley Neill
 Crabbie Whisky

1978 establishments in England
Companies based in Merseyside
Drink companies of England
Distilleries in England
Food and drink companies established in 1978
Metropolitan Borough of Knowsley
British vodkas